Invasion of Iran may refer to several historical events, including:

 Alexander the Great's conquest of Persia
Muslim conquest of Persia
Battle of Dandanaqan, part of the Seljuk invasion of Persia
Mongol conquest of Persia
Timur's conquest of Persia
 Anglo-Persian War
Persian Campaign (World War I)
 Anglo-Soviet invasion of Iran
 Iraqi invasion of Iran